Fabrizio Ficini (born 11 October 1973 in Empoli) is an Italian football (soccer) midfielder. He currently plays for Montemurlo Calcio.

References

1973 births
Italian footballers
Empoli F.C. players
S.S.C. Bari players
U.C. Sampdoria players
ACF Fiorentina players
U.S. Pistoiese 1921 players
Association football midfielders
Living people